Syed Ahmed Salman is a Rear admiral and a flag officer in the Pakistan Navy currently serving as the Deputy Chief of the Naval Staff (Supply), DCNS-S at Naval Headquarters in Islamabad. Before this he has also served as DCNS (Administration) where he took the office as Head of Administration branch of Pakistan Navy back in November 2021. Before this he as also served in a type commander post of Director of Procurement, Navy (DP NAVY) in Islamabad.

Biography
Syed Ahmed Salman joined the Pakistan Navy in 1987 and was commissioned into the Supply Branch in 1991.

References

Pakistan Navy admirals
Living people
Year of birth missing (living people)